William Nicol Carson  (16 July 1916 – 8 October 1944) was a New Zealand sportsman who represented his country at both cricket and rugby union.

Early life and family
Born in Gisborne on 16 July 1916, Carson was the son of Mabel Alice Carson (née Scoullar) and her husband Alexander John Carson, the Gisborne harbourmaster. He was educated at Gisborne Boys' High School from 1929 to 1933, where he played in the school's 1st XV rugby team in 1933, as well as in the 1st XI cricket team. Carson married Marie Patricia Jeffries at St Luke's Church, in the Auckland suburb of Remuera, on 13 August 1940. The couple were to have no children.

Cricket
Carson, an aggressive left-handed batsman and useful fast-medium bowler, started his first-class cricketing career with large scores for Auckland in the Plunket Shield in the 1936/37 season. In his second match, just his second innings of first-class cricket, Carson scored 290 against Otago at Carisbrook, part of a 445 run partnership with Paul Whitelaw. The pair set a world record for the third wicket in first-class cricket. Carson's score of 290 is still the highest maiden hundred scored by a New Zealander. In his next match, against Wellington at Eden Park, Carson made 194, giving him an aggregate of 496 runs and an average of 165.33 after three innings. His record aggregate total across his first three innings in first-class cricket stood until February 2022, when Sakibul Gani made 540 runs in his first three innings during the 2021–22 Ranji Trophy.

His performances with Auckland earned him a call up to the national side for their tour of England in 1937. Although he played 24 matches, all but four of them first-class fixtures, Carson wasn't able to break into the Test side which took on the England side. He had started the tour well, with 85 runs against Surrey and 86 versus Northamptonshire but he failed to contribute substantial scores in most matches. Carson finished the tour with 627 runs at 19.00.

Rugby union
As with his cricket career, he represented his country at rugby without appearing at Test level. He made his All Blacks debut on 20 July 1938 for a game against the Combined Western Districts. Carson then joined the New Zealand camp for a tour of Australia and played matches against Newcastle and the ACT.

World War II
Carson embarked on war duty in 1940 and went on to participate in the Crete, North African and Italian campaigns. While serving in Italy with the 5th Field Regiment of the NZ Artillery, as a major, Carson was severely wounded in battle. He was evacuated but died from jaundice aboard ship whilst being taken from Bari in Southern Italy to Egypt. He was buried at the Heliopolis War Cemetery in Cairo.

A distinguished soldier, Carson was awarded the Military Cross in June 1943, and was mentioned in dispatches.

References

Further reading

1916 births
1944 deaths
New Zealand military personnel
New Zealand rugby union players
New Zealand international rugby union players
New Zealand cricketers
Auckland cricketers
New Zealand military personnel killed in World War II
Cricketers from Gisborne, New Zealand
Ponsonby RFC players
Auckland rugby union players
People educated at Gisborne Boys' High School
Rugby union flankers
New Zealand recipients of the Military Cross
New Zealand Army officers
Rugby union players from Gisborne, New Zealand
New Zealand military personnel of World War II
Burials at Heliopolis War Cemetery